Living Together may refer to:

 Cohabitation
 Living Together (play), a 1973 play by Alan Ayckbourn
 Living Together (album), debut album of American band Vermont, or the title track
 Living Together (film), a 2011 Malayalam film directed by Fazil
 "Living Together", a song by the Bee Gees from their 1979 album Spirits Having Flown
 Living Together (TV series), a South Korean TV series renamed My Roommate Is a Gumiho